On the Horizon may refer to:

Books
On the Horizon, essay by Mongane Wally Serote 1990

Film
On the Horizon, 2015 film featuring Jessica Morris and Kristen Kerr

Music
On the Horizon (album)

Songs
On the Horizon (Ben E. King song) composed by Jerry Leiber / Mike Stoller from Don't Play That Song! 1962	
On the Horizon (Melanie C song) composed by Gregg Alexander / Melanie Jayne Chisholm / Rick Nowels